Richnava is a village and municipality in the Gelnica District in the Košice Region of eastern Slovakia. Total municipality population was in 2011 2494 inhabitants.

References

External links

http://en.e-obce.sk/obec/richnava/richnava.html

http://www.castelnuovodiportogenealogy.com/ Genealogy of The Terpak and Vascak Families 

Villages and municipalities in Gelnica District